Professor Stephen Westaby FRCS (born 27 July 1948) is a British heart surgeon at John Radcliffe Hospital, Oxford, England. He won the award of Midlander of the Year in 2002.

Early life
Westaby was raised on a council estate in Scunthorpe, Lincolnshire. In his autobiography, Fragile Lives, he claims inspiration for his career aspirations partly from watching the BBC medical documentary Your Life In Their Hands on the family's black and white television, and the harrowing first-hand perspective he had of his grandfather's deteriorating and subsequently fatal heart failure. He attended Henderson Avenue Junior School and Scunthorpe Grammar School (now The St Lawrence Academy). He went to Charing Cross Hospital Medical School. He has claimed to have 'never been a straight-A student' and attributes his success in surgery primarily down to his manual dexterity, ambidexterity and ability to draw – traits he claims to have had from an early age.

Career
Westaby and his team performed Peter Houghton's heart operation in June 2000, implanting a Jarvik 7 artificial left ventricular assist device, a turbine pump. Peter Houghton (1938–2007) became the longest living person with an electrical heart pump in the world.

His memoir of his career as a heart surgeon, Fragile Lives: A Heart Surgeon’s Stories of Life and Death on the Operating Table, was published in 2017 by HarperCollins. The book was shortlisted for the 2017 Costa Book Awards Biography Award and won the 2017 BMA president's choice award. A second memoir, The Knife's Edge: The Heart and Mind of a Cardiac Surgeon, was published by HarperCollins in 2019.

Personal life
He is married with one son and one daughter.

References 

1948 births
21st-century English medical doctors
Alumni of Charing Cross Medical School
British cardiac surgeons
Fellows of the Royal College of Surgeons
Living people
People from Scunthorpe
Physicians of the John Radcliffe Hospital